The  was an army of the Imperial Japanese Army during the final days of World War II.

History
The Japanese 59th Army was formed on June 15, 1945, under the Japanese 15th Area Army as part of the last desperate defense effort by the Empire of Japan to deter possible landings of Allied forces in the San'yo region of western Honshū during Operation Downfall.  The Japanese 59th Army consisted mostly of poorly trained reservists, conscripted students and home guard militia. Headquartered in Hiroshima, most of its command staff, including its commander Lieutenant General Yoji Fujii, were killed during the atomic bombing of Hiroshima. Together with the 2nd General Army, Fifth Division, and other combat divisions in the city who were also hit, an estimated 20,000 Japanese combatants were killed. Remnants of the 59th Army attempted to perform relief work and maintain public order in the devastated city with little success. The IJA 59th Army was officially demobilized after the surrender of Japan on August 15, 1945.

List of Commanders

Commanding officer

Chief of Staff

References

External links

Notes

59
Military units and formations established in 1945
Military units and formations disestablished in 1945